So-Hi is an unincorporated community and census-designated place in Mohave County, in the U.S. state of Arizona. The population was 428 at the 2020 census, down from 477 in 2010.

Geography
U.S. Route 93 runs past the south end of the community, leading southeast into Kingman and northwest  to Las Vegas, Nevada.

Demographics

References

Census-designated places in Mohave County, Arizona